Hoon Hay is an outer suburb of Christchurch, New Zealand, located at the base of the Port Hills and about  southwest of Cathedral Square. The area was named by Captain Wickham Talbot Harvey, a captain of the British Royal 10th Hussars, who moved to the area in 1852 and named it after the farm near Hatton, Derbyshire where he grew up. Harvey only stayed in the area for four years, before a fire destroyed his property and prompted him to return to the United Kingdom. Further fires in the following years destroyed the woodland which was on the property, including several large Tōtara, causing it to be converted into farmland.  Remnants of this forest remain visible in the area, including with tree stumps being discovered during flood mitigation work on the Ōpāwaho / Heathcote River.

Hoon Hay maintains aspects of both a rural and suburban surrounding. It is bordered by the suburbs of Hillmorton and Spreydon to the north, Somerfield and Cashmere to the east and Halswell to the southwest, along with new developments in the adjacent Port Hills. Despite this, the suburb is also bordered by farmland and the nearby Hoon Hay valley, maintaining the suburb as semi-rural. The Cashmere Stream, a tributary of the Ōpāwaho / Heathcote River, flows down the valley and through the suburb.

Demographics

Hoon Hay had a population of 8,595 at the 2018 New Zealand census, an increase of 273 people (3.3%) since the 2013 census, and an increase of 384 people (4.7%) since the 2006 census. There were 3,051 households. There were 4,302 males and 4,296 females, giving a sex ratio of 1.0 males per female, with 1,824 people (21.2%) aged under 15 years, 1,755 (20.4%) aged 15 to 29, 3,840 (44.7%) aged 30 to 64, and 1,170 (13.6%) aged 65 or older.

Ethnicities were 79.0% European/Pākehā, 11.3% Māori, 9.2% Pacific peoples, 8.8% Asian, and 3.2% other ethnicities (totals add to more than 100% since people could identify with multiple ethnicities).

The proportion of people born overseas was 21.6%, compared with 27.1% nationally.

Although some people objected to giving their religion, 49.7% had no religion, 37.9% were Christian, 0.9% were Hindu, 1.2% were Muslim, 0.6% were Buddhist and 2.7% had other religions.

Of those at least 15 years old, 1,470 (21.7%) people had a bachelor or higher degree, and 1,260 (18.6%) people had no formal qualifications. The employment status of those at least 15 was that 3,558 (52.5%) people were employed full-time, 981 (14.5%) were part-time, and 258 (3.8%) were unemployed.

Education
Hoon Hay Te Kura Kōaka and Rowley Avenue School are state contributing primary schools for years 1 to 6. Hoon Hay opened in 1959.

Our Lady of the Assumption School is a state-integrated full primary school for years 1 to 8. It has a roll of  students. It opened in 1957.

All these schools are coeducational. Rolls are as of

References

Suburbs of Christchurch